Roger Paternoster (born 20 June 1934) is a Belgian field hockey player. He competed in the men's tournament at the 1956 Summer Olympics.

References

External links
 

1934 births
Living people
Belgian male field hockey players
Olympic field hockey players of Belgium
Field hockey players at the 1956 Summer Olympics
Sportspeople from Antwerp